7th Regiment of Bombay Native Infantry may refer to:
113th Infantry which was the 1st Battalion
114th Mahrattas which was the 2nd Battalion